The Kharberd–Yerznka dialect was a group of varieties of the same dialect that were spoken in the regions of Kharberd, Erzincan, Dersim, and Kiğı in the Ottoman Empire before WWI. After which it was spoken only in the diaspora In Syria, Romania, United States, and Lebanon. Although the Dersim variety was still spoken in Tunceli until 1938 when The Alevi Ashirets were dissolved and the remaining Armenians of Tunceli became Alevi and were assimilated into Zaza society.

Variations
Hrachia Acharian wrote short stories in different regional variations of the dialect in his 1909 book.

Kharberd Subdialect: Gëli Chëli Khoroz më gëlli, As Khorozin Odkë push më gë mënna, Inch Geneh Chener chi gërnër ad pushë haner. Gellah gerta mamigi më gësa, ki as pushë hana!
Eastern Armenian comparison: Këlini Chi-Lini, Mi aklor Këlini, Es Aklori Votkë push k'mtni, Ich arav charav chk'aroghatsav et pushë haner. K'elni kerta mayrin kasi, es pushë hani!
Dersim Subdialect: Tsors dzin al Barrgetsutsi, Meg martun al glokhë gëyretsi, Desa or pasan Gëseh, Ha babam olasëz, tsi gider o yes im, ëni gide te turker Ghamber'n eh brnadz.
Eastern Armenian: Chors dziyern el p'arkatsram, mek' marti glukhn dzer tvam, T'esa vor pasan asav, ha im papi dziyern, ch'giter vor yes im, inkë k'artzumer vor Turkerë Ghambarë vertsran.
Erzincan Subdialect: Erikë k'ita dzovun kenarë kë nst'i, mek' hats ink kutë, mek'aln a dzovun dzk'nerun kë net'i. Anmen or medz dzouk më kuga ënonts dzerken k'arneh, k'tani agher. ësank' k'aneh t'ari më anmen or. 
Eastern Armenian: Erikë kerta tzovi shurj k'nsti, mek' hats inkë kuti, mek'n el tzovi dzoukerin k'neti. Amen or metz dzouk g'ga irants dzerkerits k'arni u k'tani. esi tarin amen or arav.

Notable speakers
Shahan Natalie (1884–1983) Author, Dashnak, 
Vahan Totovents (1889–1938) Writer, poet
Tlgadintsi (1860–1915) Writer, poet
Hamastegh (1895–1966) Writer, poet
Soghomon Tehlirian (1896–1960)
Varaztad Kazanjian (1879–1974) Dentist

Songs and examples in the dialect
Conversation in dialect
Jacques Kebadian
Husseinig ballad
Gesurin naz bare
Dersim folk music

References

Armenian dialects